Thyridiphora furia is a species of moth in the family Crambidae described by Charles Swinhoe in 1884. It is found in Greece, Lebanon, Pakistan, Niger, Yemen, Seychelles and Kenya.

References

Moths described in 1884
Cybalomiinae
Moths of Europe
Moths of Africa
Moths of Asia
Moths of the Middle East